This is a list of mayors of Ghent, Belgium:

1800s

1900s

2000s

See also
 Timeline of Ghent

References

info from het Liberaal Archief (in Dutch)

Ghent